The Holiday Pacific and Southern Tower was a 468.7 meters tall guyed mast for FM- and TV-broadcasting located in Holiday, Florida, United States. It was built in 1979.

The tower was unusual in that it was situated in a residential area, surrounded by houses. Generally, the area around guyed masts is not developed into private residences, owing to the likelihood of incidental property damage from ice (rare at this latitude) or grease (from periodic maintenance of the guys) falling from the guys to the ground below. Another factor is that the high proximal intensity of radio and television transmissions can be a source of electromagnetic interference, affecting the electronic devices of nearby homeowners.

The Holiday Pacific and Southern Tower was dismantled in February 2012. A smaller radio tower built next to it in the 1990s and reportedly dismantled in 2013 (though still standing in 2019) was mistaken as being the Holiday Pacific and Southern Tower at an earlier date in this article.

See also 
 List of masts

References

External links 
 Antenna Structure Registration

Towers in Florida
Radio masts and towers in the United States
Towers completed in 1979
1979 establishments in Florida
2012 disestablishments in Florida
Buildings and structures in Pasco County, Florida